The Petricolidae is a family of saltwater clams, marine bivalve molluscs related to the large family Veneridae or Venus clams. Some authors include these genera within the Veneridae as the subfamily Petricolinae.

Genera and species
Genera and species in the family Petricolidae include:
 Choristodon Jonas, 1844
 Choristodon robustum (G. B. Sowerby I, 1834)
 Cooperella Carpenter, 1864
 Cooperella atlantica Rehder, 1943
 Cooperella subdiaphana (Carpenter, 1864)
 Mysia Lamarck, 1818
 Mysia undata (Pennant, 1777)

 Petricola Lamarck, 1801
 Petricolaria Stoliczka, 1870
 Rupellaria Fleuriau de Bellevue, 1802
 Rupellaria cancellata (Verrill, 1885)
 Rupellaria denticulata (Sowerby, 1834)
 Rupellaria tellimyalis (Carpenter, 1864)

References

 
Bivalve families